

Al-Rumayṣāʾ bint Milḥān (died  650 CE; 28 AH), popularly known by her kunya as Umm Sulaym, was one of the earliest women converts to Islam in Yathrib (now Medina). Umm Sulaym was first married to Malik ibn an-Nadr and her son by this marriage was Anas ibn Malik, a notable companion of Muhammad.

Following the death of her first husband, Abu Talha al-Ansari resolved to become engaged to her before anyone else did. He was confident that Umm Sulaym would not pass him over for another. He was quite rich, an accomplished horseman, and a skilful archer and he belonged to the same clan as Umm Sulaym, the Banu Najjar. But she refused. Abu Talha did not take no for an answer. He asked her if there was someone more worthy for her than him, and she explained that she was a Muslim and could not marry a polytheist. He accepted Islam and they were married, and she started educating him in Islam. Abu Talhah became a devout Muslim who loved to be in the company of Muhammad. Abu Talhah died while he was on a naval expedition during the time of the caliph Uthman, and was buried at sea.

See also
 Bruriah

References

Citations

Bibliography

 

Female wartime nurses
Najjarite people
Women companions of the Prophet
Women in medieval warfare
Women in war in the Middle East
650s deaths
Year of birth unknown
7th-century Arabs
Arab women in war